Pakkawat Vilailak (born 30 October 1988) is a Thai badminton player. He was specializing in singles but in early 2013, made a notable switch to doubles to partner Bodin Isara after the latter ended his partnership with Maneepong Jongjit. He was the men's singles champion at the 2010 Kaohsiung International Challenge tournament.

Achievements

BWF Grand Prix 
The BWF Grand Prix had two levels, the Grand Prix and Grand Prix Gold. It was a series of badminton tournaments sanctioned by the Badminton World Federation (BWF) and played between 2007 and 2017.

Men's doubles

  BWF Grand Prix Gold tournament
  BWF Grand Prix tournament

BWF International Challenge/Series 
Men's singles

  BWF International Challenge tournament
  BWF International Series tournament

References

External links 

 

Living people
1988 births
Pakkawat Vilailak
Badminton players at the 2010 Asian Games
Pakkawat Vilailak
Asian Games medalists in badminton
Medalists at the 2010 Asian Games
Competitors at the 2007 Southeast Asian Games
Competitors at the 2009 Southeast Asian Games
Competitors at the 2011 Southeast Asian Games
Competitors at the 2015 Southeast Asian Games
Pakkawat Vilailak
Pakkawat Vilailak
Southeast Asian Games medalists in badminton